Anteaeolidiella cacaotica is a species of sea slug, an aeolid nudibranch. It is a shell-less marine gastropod mollusc in the family Aeolidiidae.

Distribution
This species was described from Port Jackson, Australia. It has been reported from Japan, the Line Islands, and New Caledonia.

Description
The body of Anteaeolidiella cacaotica is orange, with a series of white, teardrop-shaped markings on the midline of its notum. Its rhinophores and oral tentacles are white-tipped.

References

Aeolidiidae
Gastropods described in 1855